Igor Yakovlevich Vysotsky (born 10 September 1953 in Yagodnoye, Magadan Oblast) is a retired Soviet boxer who competed from 1971 to 1980, best known for twice defeating the triple Olympic Champion Teófilo Stevenson, being the only boxer out of more than two hundred Stevenson's opponents to ever knock him out, though himself never participated in the Olympics. Standing 5 feet 11¼ inches tall, and weighing around 202-213 lbs at his prime, he was the Soviet Heavyweight Champion in 1978, ranked the #1 Soviet heavyweight of the late 1970s from the American standpoint, and had an amateur record of 161–24. Representing the Trud Sports Club, Vysotsky was known and widely recognized for his aggressive style, punching power, stamina and durable chin, having 24 losses in his record he had never experienced any other than standing defeat (never has been knocked down in his career.) While apart of the 1978 he never stepped-up semi-finals at the national championships, being constantly outpointed by technically skilled opponents, his unorthodox style and mentioned strengths counted for he always was chosen to compete versus U.S. heavyweights in the USA–USSR match-ups, presenting a considerable level of opposition when it came to trading punches.

Early years 
Igor Vysotsky was born to a family of exile settlers. His father Yakov Antonovich Vysotsky, a Soviet Jew, also an amateur boxer, was a Soviet Naval Infantryman, serving with the Red Navy, fought the Germans during the World War II, after being severely wounded he was taken a prisoner of war. It was rumored that while being stationed at a POW camp, he was used as a human-dummy sparring partner for the German Heavyweight Champion Max Schmeling. He tried to escape several times, his ninth escape attempt was successful, however, Yakov Vysotsky was moved to a Soviet filtration camp, and then to the Far Eastern part of the USSR, to a GULAG camp at Kolyma, where he met Meeta Joganovna Suve, an exiled Estonian woman, whom he married, and she became mother of Igor Vysotsky. From the age of six, Igor has been trained daily by Yakov Antonovich, who became a mentor for his son. Igor Vysotsky went to a gym at 12 years old, weighing 163 lbs. He lost at his debut at the 1966 Magadan city championship.

Vysotsky graduated from the Magadan Teachers Training Institute, where he studied to become a PE teacher.

Boxing career 

The first nation-wide boxing event for Igor Vysotsky was a matchup in Alma-Ata in 1971. In 1972 he won silver at the Soviet Youth Boxing Tournament in Moscow. In 1973 he entered his first international boxing event.

Vysotsky's first bout with Stevenson was in July 1973, he defeated Teófilo by a 3–2 decision. Their second and final meeting was in April 1976. Vysotsky stopped Stevenson in the third round.

Shortly before the 1976 Montreal Olympics, Vysotsky was badly cut in a sparring session, which prevented his participation in the Olympics (bloody cuts were a chief problem for Vysotsky throughout his career due to the anatomic features of his massive brow ridges, resulting in a number of referee-stopped contests). The Cubans didn't know about the injury and sent two heavyweights to Montreal, Stevenson and Ángel Milián Rivero. Had Vysotskiy participated, Stevenson would have sat on the alternate's bench.

In 1976, he stopped future WBA Heavyweight Champion Tony Tubbs in two rounds. The following year, he fought another future WBA Heavyweight Champion, Greg Page, losing by a split decision. Both bouts were in Las Vegas, Nevada and were part of a series of matches between the American and Soviet teams.

His prime years were in the mid-1970s, by November 1975 Vysotsky has won 98 amateur fights against just 13 losses. All of his losses by that time have been against other Soviet fighters, he said. Curiosity of the situation in 1975, when he became the top-ranked heavyweight amateur boxer in the world acclaimed by AIBA, highly touted by the Western press, the signs in front of the Madison Square Garden all hailed his coming to the United States, but oddly enough, the Soviet boxing authorities named the #1 heavyweight boxer in the USSR Yevgeniy Gorstkov, who has met Vysotsky once and stopped him on cuts. Gorstkov modestly said his victory over Vysotsky was luck. "Anybody can win any given fight. This time, I just had the luck." And as Vysotsky never has been knocked down, but the Russians admit he has a tendency to cut. Both his eyes are surrounded by scar tissue, which some have suggested should be removed by surgery. But Gorstkov, a 25-year-old veteran with a 120–17 record in an eight-year career, is relatively unmarked. "Everybody has a different opinion about how to fight Vysotsky. But you have to see him to really know how to fight him," Gorstkov said.

In June 1978, Muhammad Ali went on a ten-day to the Soviet Union. While there, he exhibited several rounds vis-à-vis Vysotsky. While watching the bout in retrospect Ali told Howard Cosell: "He hits real hard."

Vysotsky's last fight was at the 1980 National Championships. He lost to Yevgeniy Gorstkov again due to a cut. After retirement Vysotsky worked as a coach and sport functionary, particularly as vice-president of the Boxing Federation of Moscow Oblast.

After the retirement from competition, he established Yakov Vysotskiy Memorial annual open boxing memorial (to commemorate his father) at his hometown of Yagodnoye.

Highlights 
Notable bouts include:

Usov Memorial Tournament (+81 kg), Minsk, Belarus SSR, October 1971:
1/4: Lost to Anghel Iancu (Romania) by decision

 VI Giraldo Córdova Cardín Tournament (+81 kg), Santiago de Cuba, Cuba, July 1973:
1/2: Defeated José Luis Cabrera (Cuba) by decision
Finals: Defeated Teófilo Stevenson (Cuba) by split decision, 3–2

 Black Diamonds Tournament (+81 kg), Katowice, Poland, June 1974:
Finals: Lost to Andrzej Biegalski (Poland) RSCI 2 

 Dutch Open (+81 kg), Amsterdam, Netherlands, October 1974:
1/4: Defeated Georgi Stoimenov (Bulgaria) KO 2
1/2: Defeated Lolle Van Houten (Netherlands) RET 1
Finals: Defeated Felipe Rodríguez Piñeiro (Spain) by walkover

 Usov Memorial Tournament (+81 kg), Minsk, Belarus SSR, April 1976:
Finals: Defeated Teófilo Stevenson (Cuba) KO 3

 Golden Belt Tournament (+81 kg), Bucharest, Romania, April 1977:
1/4: Defeated Nicolae Grigore (Romania) RET 3
1/2 : Defeated Ángel Milián Rivero (Cuba) by decision
Finals: Lost to Mircea Șimon (Romania) by walkover

X Giraldo Córdova Cardín Tournament (+81 kg), Matanzas, Cuba, July 1977:
 Lost to Ángel Milián Rivero (Cuba) by decision

 Vaclav Prochazka Tournament (+81 kg), Ostrava, Czechoslovakia, September 1977:
Finals: Defeated Dietmar Mayer (East Germany) by split decision, 3–2

World Championships (+81 kg), Belgrade, Yugoslavia, May 1978:
1/8: Lost to Dominique Nato (France) by split decision, 2–3

 International Tournament (+91 kg), Alma-Ata, Kazakh SSR, March 1979:
Finals: Lost to Ángel Milián Rivero (Cuba) by decision

XII Giraldo Córdova Cardín Tournament (+81 kg), Havana, Cuba, May 1979:
 Lost to Ángel Milián Rivero (Cuba) by decision

USA–USSR Duals 

 May 17, 1974, Kislovodsk, RSFSR: Defeated Clifford Stevens KO 1
 January 22, 1975, Caesars Tahoe, Lake Tahoe, Nevada: Defeated Emory Chapman RSC 3
 January 28, 1975, Felt Forum, New York City: Defeated Helton Willis KO 1 
 November 15, 1975, Madison Square Garden, New York City: Lost to Jimmy Clark  RSC 3 
 November 27, 1976, Sahara Hotel Space Center, Las Vegas, Nevada: Defeated Tony Tubbs RSC 2
 December 3, 1976, Madison Square Garden, New York City: Defeated Jimmy Clark  RSC 3
 January 29, 1977, Las Vegas, Nevada: Defeated Jimmy Clark PTS
 February 5, 1977, Milwaukee, Wisconsin: Defeated Woody Clark KO 2
 December 10, 1977, Hilton Pavilion, Las Vegas, Nevada: Lost to Greg Page by split decision, 1–2 
 December 1977, Superdome, New Orleans, Louisiana: Defeated Charles Garrett PTS
 March 31, 1978, Alma-Ata, Kazakh SSR: Defeated Mitch Green  PTS

Vysotsky won eight out of his first ten bouts with American boxers, six of them by knockout.

Vysotsky says his most difficult opponents were Ángel Milián Rivero, whom he fought several times winning once, and Yevgeniy Gorstkov. After Cubans found out that Rivero posed a real challenge for Vysotsky, they brought him up to every event where Soviets sent or could have sent Vysotsky. Interestingly, Rivero himself met Stevenson ten times at various national match-ups, winning just one of them by walkover, scoring four draws, and losing five times, twice by knockout.

Rivalry with Stevenson 
Teófilo Stevenson was known for two fights with Vysotsky, who defeated Stevenson twice. Vysotsky later revealed in his interview to East Side Boxing:

Vysotsky employed evasive infighting tactics during his standoffs versus Stevenson, by cutting distance and constantly ducking under Stevenson's left hand, thus escaping from his devastating jabs and straight punches, and then driving upwards, getting him with short, effective hooks. Jimmy Clark, an American heavyweight from West Chester, Pa., who once defeated Vysotsky, challenged Stevenson three times in 1978 in 1980, said: "If Vysotsky can do it, so can I," but did not succeed.

Exhibition boxing record

References

Links
 Amateur career of Igor Vysotsky (in Spanish) compiled by Pedro Cabrera Isidron of the Cuban Olympics Committee. Last updated: August 13, 2006
 Amateur Boxing Results

Living people
People from Yagodninsky District
Heavyweight boxers
1953 births
Soviet male boxers
Jewish boxers
Soviet Jews